Canberra railway station is located on the NSW TrainLink Regional Southern Line in the Australian Capital Territory, Australia. It is located in the Canberra suburb of Kingston.

History

In March 1913, work began on a new  rail link from Queanbeyan to the Capital, with a new branch of on the Bombala line. The line was constructed, managed, and operated by the New South Wales Public Works Department on behalf of the Government of Australia. It came under the control of the Commonwealth Railways in 1927.

The station building opened on 21 April 1924. Passenger services had run between the Kingston Powerhouse and Queanbeyan for around six months prior to the station opening.

In October 1926 the Great White Train visited Canberra station, attracting nearly 2,500 people. The train was established by the Australian-made Preference League as a traveling exhibition to promote Australian made goods and represented around thirty manufacturers from across New South Wales. The -long, 16 carriage train arrived just before 2pm on Saturday 23 October and stayed until the following evening before heading to Queanbeyan for a three-day stay.

From 1927 when the Federal Parliament moved to Canberra, the rail passenger service was upgraded with the introduction of a Canberra portion to the Cooma Mail overnight train to Sydney that connected with Melbourne sleeper trains at Goulburn. A daylight service from Sydney was also introduced.

By the late 1930s, the temporary station building had begun to receive criticism for its basic nature and lack of amenities. In 1956 the ACT Advisory Council sent a comprehensive report to the Minister for the Interior Allen Fairhall, which noted the station was the 'worst advertisement in Canberra'.

In March 1961, a tragic accident at Canberra station saw a 12-year-old boy lose his leg. Robert Wilkes had been playing on the locomotive turntable at the goods yard when he fell between the table and the track. A doctor had to amputate his right leg above the knee to free him.

The present passenger terminal building was opened by the Minister for Transport & Shipping, Gordon Freeth on 26 October 1966. Built at a cost of $160,000, it was intended to be another temporary solution until a new, permanent home for railway opened closer to the airport "somewhere in the Pialligo area".Canberra station, along with the line to Queanbeyan, was owned and staffed by the Commonwealth Railways and later Australian National although services were always operated by the New South Wales Government Railways and its successors. Despite numerous attempts to transfer the loss making line to the Government of New South Wales, it remained in Federal Government hands until May 1985 when it was transferred to the State Rail Authority.

Steam locomotive 1210 that had hauled the first train into Canberra in May 1914, was displayed on a plinth outside the station from January 1962 until September 1984, when it was moved to the Canberra Railway Museum and returned to service in 1988.

From 23 April 1995 the X 2000 tilt train ran between Canberra and Sydney for a seven-week trial. Two daily services ran in addition to the three daily Xplorer services, with a journey time 45 minute shorter. The service departed at 10.45am and 6.30pm, arriving Sydney at 2.10pm and 9.58pm respectively.

Services

Canberra is the terminus for the New South Wales Xplorer service by NSW TrainLink from the Central railway station, Sydney. It is also served by NSW TrainLink road coach services to Cootamundra, Bombala and Eden. V/Line coach service to Bairnsdale also operates via the station.

The Xplorer Service to Central Station stops at the following stations:

 Canberra
 Queanbeyan
 Bungendore
 Tarago
 Goulburn
 Bundanoon
 Moss Vale
 Bowral
 Mittagong
 Campbelltown
 Central Station - Sydney

New location proposals

The current site of Canberra's railway terminal is broadly accepted to be accidental, owing to a lack of consensus and political will to agree on a suitable location. Even as Australia's most planned city, no agreement has been reached for a permanent home for the city's railway, with no fewer than five separate locations considered over the past 100 years. Canberra's current station building is the city's second temporary rail terminal.

In 1925 plans for the city of Canberra were gazetted, which included a railway extending from Kingston to Dickson via Russell and the city. Stations on this line were planned in 1918 to include Russell, Anzac Parade, Ainslie Ave and MacArthur Ave. The short-lived Kingston to Civic goods railway was constructed along this route in 1921.

In 1938 the Federal Minister of the Interior John McEwen stated in Parliament that the Kingston station was temporary and that the 'site of the permanent railway station for Canberra is in Civic Centre' and that the 'present station is well off the route of the permanent railway'. Though in 1940, the rails that had been laid in anticipation of a permanent Civic Line were removed and by the 1950s, locations south of the lake for the new station were under consideration, including Bowen Place (adjacent to Kings Ave bridge) and State Circle (adjacent to Parliament House).

By 1966, when the current temporary station opened, the intention was to construct a permanent railway station north of the lake in Pialligo, close to the airport. At this time proposals for a high-speed trains to Sydney and a new line to Yass were being considered.

The ACT Government published plans for Canberra's Eastlake area in 2010 that would see the removal of most of its railway infrastructure, making way for urban development. A new passenger railway station was proposed to sit between Jerrabomberra Creek and the Monaro Highway. 

In 2013 a report by the Federal Labor Government proposed a three-platform station under Ainslie Avenue – north of Cooyong Street and the Canberra Centre. The location would require four kilometres of tunnel passing through Mount Ainslie. The proposed location is a close approximation to the City station included in Walter Burley Griffin's plan for Canberra.

In 2016 the ACT Government and Canberra Airport backed moving Canberra Station  further from the city to a new location at the airport. The Government intends passengers to transfer there with the future light rail service to the city. In 2021 there were no fewer than 16 daily coach services between Canberra's CBD and Sydney Central, yet none between Canberra Airport and Sydney, bringing in to question the demand for a high-speed rail terminal at the airport. Should the airport be chosen as the new location, Canberra station would be  from the CBD, the furthest distance of any Australian capital other than Darwin.

In 2017, the ACT Government announced it had protected from development a fork-shaped railway corridor stretching from Eaglehawk on the ACT-NSW border heading southeast to Canberra Airport with an alternative branch southwest to Ainslie Ave. The route runs roughly parallel to Majura Parkway. The ACT Government also indicated it was no longer content for Canberra to be on a spur-line between Sydney and Melbourne and was in discussions with the Federal Government on including Canberra on the main line of any high-speed rail route proposal.

There are currently no published plans for a direct heavy railway connecting Queanbeyan, Canberra Airport and a station in Canberra City along preserved Majura rail corridors. The 11 km route could provide an alternative gateway for Canberra, aligning with the NSW Government's commitment to faster rail between Canberra and Sydney. In 2018 the NSW Government announced its intent to 'look at' a light rail connection between Queanbeyan and Canberra, without indicating a route preference.

The group supporting proposals that the current station site in Kingston be "freed-up" for redevelopment.

ACT Government plans to move Canberra station to a site adjacent to the Monaro Highway were re-ignited in 2022. No new plans have been laid-out by the government, however the 2010 plans have been linked with the consultation process. Planning reports are expected mid-2023.

Kingston to Civic Railway

Walter Burley Griffin's original Canberra plan included a railway to come to Canberra City, with stations on the north, east and south.

Work started in December 1920, with the line opening on 15 June 1921. It branched off from the Queanbeyan to Canberra line at the Power House siding near Cunningham Street, heading north on a raised embankment through the Causeway, and across the Molonglo River. The bridges over Jerrabomberra Creek and Molonglo River were of low temporary standard. A siding was provided to the north of the river at Russell for the workers camp that was there. The line curved to the north west in Reid, behind St Johns Church and the TAFE. A platform for the railway was built in what is now Garema Place. Finally, a line continued to the north to Eloura Street in Braddon where there was a marshalling yard.

The track was owned and maintained by the Commonwealth Railways with trains operated by the New South Wales Government Railways.

In July 1922, a flood on the Molonglo River washed away the legs on the trestle bridge, leaving the bridge deck suspended by the rails and sagging into the water. The bridge was never reconstructed and the rails were removed in 1940.

Brickworks tramway
A narrow gauge 1,067-millimetre line was built in 1923 from the Yarralumla brickworks to Old Parliament House. This passed along Adelaide Avenue, and round the north of State Circle. A branch went to the Hotel Canberra. The line continued to the Power House in Kingston. The brickworks tramway was extended to Civic. It crossed the Molonglo River on a bridge near Scotts Crossing. The tramway terminated at Civic Centre station. The tramway was dismantled on 9 May 1927 as a cleanup for the opening of Parliament House.

Railways planned but never built
The building of a railway between Canberra and Yass was specified in the Seat of Government Acceptance Act 1909, and plans were made to extend the existing Canberra line to Yass in 1924 and 1934. The proposal was last considered by the government in 1971 but was not considered to be economically justified.

During World War I plans were drawn up for a railway to the Tuggeranong Arsenal. The route ran from the Queanbeyan line via Macarthur, Fadden, Erindale, Wanniassa and Oxley to a station in north east Greenway. There was also to be a hospital near the Kambah Wool Shed, a small-arms factory near Pine Island, and a civic centre. The line was not constructed.

A plan was also drawn for a Canberra to Jervis Bay line in 1914, which would connect Canberra with what was to be its port. As part of this scheme, a route was considered to link Yass to Canberra, and ultimately to Jervis Bay, around 1917. Little was heard of this project after 1921.

The viability of a rail line from Canberra to Eden via Cooma was investigated after the NSW Government funded a $1 million study in 2018. The proposed route would include reinstating the majority of the disused Bombala Line, extending  to the coast at the southern end of the line and north  from HMAS Harman to Canberra Airport. In October 2020, the viability study found the proposal would not be economically viable, given the costs associated with extending the line through challenging terrain to the coast.

References

Further reading

 
 Canberra's Engineering Heritage, 2nd edition, Chapter 2 by Walter M Shellshear.

External links
 
 Canberra station details Transport for New South Wales

Railway stations in the Australian Capital Territory
Railway stations in Australia opened in 1924
Transport in Canberra